Dennis Edward Freeman (August 7, 1944 – April 25, 2021) was an American Texas and electric blues guitarist. Although he is primarily known as a guitar player, Freeman also played piano and electronic organ, both in concert and on various recordings.  He worked with Stevie Ray Vaughan, Jimmie Vaughan, Bob Dylan, Angela Strehli, Lou Ann Barton, James Cotton, Taj Mahal, Barry Goldberg and Percy Sledge amongst others.

Early life
Freeman was born in Orlando, Florida, on August 7, 1944.  He spent his adolescence in Dallas, Texas, in the late 1950s and played in a rock group called The Corals while in high school. He went to college in North Texas, and had a brief stay in Los Angeles, before relocating in 1970 to Austin, Texas.

Career
Freeman started his career as co-lead guitarist in the Cobras with Stevie Ray Vaughan.  He became a founding member of Southern Feeling in 1972, along with W. C. Clark and Angela Strehli. He later recorded with Lou Ann Barton. Freeman lived and played with both Jimmie and Stevie Ray Vaughan throughout the 1970s and 1980s. He played piano on Jimmie Vaughan's first solo tour, and on a James Cotton album. At Antone's nightclub in the early 1980s, Freeman was a member of the house band and backed Otis Rush, Albert Collins, Buddy Guy, Junior Wells, and Lazy Lester.

After touring with Jimmie Vaughan in the mid 1990s he toured with Taj Mahal until 2002. A songwriter on his five mainly instrumental albums, Freeman lived again in Los Angeles from 1992 until 2004. Freeman played with Bob Dylan's backing band between 2005 and 2009. Dylan's album, Modern Times was recorded with Dylan's then touring band, including Freeman, Tony Garnier, George G. Receli, Stu Kimball, plus multi-instrumentalist Donnie Herron. During a 2006 interview with Rolling Stone, Dylan spoke about his current band:

Clem Burke played the drums on Freeman's solo offering, Twang Bang (2006).

Later life
Freeman was inducted into the Austin Music Awards Hall of Fame in 2009.

Freeman died on April 25, 2021, in Austin, Texas.  He was 76, and was diagnosed with abdominal cancer several weeks before his death.

Credits
Freeman co-wrote "Baboom/Mama Said" on The Vaughan Brothers' 1990 album, Family Style
He played piano on Jimmie Vaughan's 1994 album, Strange Pleasure, and organ on his 1998 follow-up, Out There.
He co-wrote "Boom Boom in the Zoom Zoom Room" on Blondie's 1999 No Exit album.
Freeman played guitar on Taj Mahal and the Phantom Blues Band's Grammy Award winning live album, Shoutin' in Key (2000).
He played guitar on Percy Sledge's 2004 album, Shining Through the Rain, and co-wrote with Fontaine Brown the song "Love Come and Rescue Me".
 He played guitar on Bob Dylan’s 2006 album Modern Times.
Freeman played guitar, organ and piano on Doyle Bramhall's 2007 album, Is It News. 
He played guitar on two of Barry Goldberg's albums, Stoned Again (2002) and In the Groove (2018).

Discography
Blues Cruise (1986) – Amazing
Out of the Blue (1987) – Amazing
Denny Freeman (1991) – Amazing
A Tone for My Sins (1997) – Dallas Blues Society
Denny Freeman and the Cobras  (live album) (2000) – Crosscut (Germany)
Twang Bang (2006) – V8
Diggin on Dylan (2012) – V8 Records

See also
List of Texas blues musicians
List of electric blues musicians
List of Austin City Limits performers
Never Ending Tour

References

External links
 
 

1944 births
2021 deaths
American blues guitarists
American male guitarists
American blues pianists
American male pianists
Songwriters from Florida
Texas blues musicians
Electric blues musicians
Musicians from Orlando, Florida
Songwriters from Texas
Guitarists from Florida
Guitarists from Texas
20th-century American guitarists
20th-century American pianists
21st-century American pianists
20th-century American male musicians
21st-century American male musicians
American male songwriters